Corbeilles (also known as Corbeilles-en-Gâtinais) is a commune in the Loiret department in north-central France.

See also
Communes of the Loiret department

References

Communes of Loiret